P81 may refer to:

 Consolidated Vultee XP-81, an American experimental fighter aircraft
 , a patrol boat of the Royal Australian Navy
 , a submarine of the Royal Navy
 , a corvette of the Indian Navy
 Papyrus 81, an early copy of the New Testament in Greek
 P81, a state regional road in Latvia